Over the Fence may refer to:

 Over the Fence (1917 film), a 1917 short comedy film starring Harold Lloyd
Over the Fence (1923 film), directed by Earl Montgomery
 Over the Fence (2009 film), a 2009 short Finnish film
 Over the Fence (2016 film), a 2016 Japanese film directed by Nobuhiro Yamashita